De Quervain syndrome is mucoid degeneration of two tendons that control movement of the thumb and their tendon sheath. This results in pain and tenderness on the thumb side of the wrist. Radial abduction of the thumb is painful. On occasion, there is uneven movement or triggering the thumb with radial abduction. Symptoms can come on gradually or be noted suddenly.

The diagnosis is generally based on symptoms and physical examination. Diagnosis is supported if pain increases when the wrist is bent inwards while a person is grabbing their thumb within a fist. 

There is some evidence that the natural history of de Quervain tendinopathy is resolution over a period of about 1 year. Symptomatic alleviation (palliative treatment) is provided mainly by splinting the thumb and wrist. Pain medications such as NSAIDs can also be considered. Steroid injections are commonly used, but are not proved to alter the natural history of the condition. Surgery to release the first dorsal component is an option. It may be most common in middle age.

Signs and symptoms
Symptoms are pain and tenderness at the radial side of the wrist, fullness or thickening over the thumb side of the wrist, and difficulty gripping with the affected side of the hand. The onset is often gradual. Pain is made worse by movement of the thumb and wrist, and may radiate to the thumb or the forearm.

Causes
The cause of de Quervain's disease is not established. Evidence regarding a possible relation with activity and occupation is debated. A systematic review of potential risk factors discussed in the literature did not find any evidence of a causal relationship with activity or occupation. However, researchers in France found personal and work-related factors were associated with de Quervain's disease in the working population; wrist bending and movements associated with the twisting or driving of screws were the most significant of the work-related factors. Proponents of the view that De Quervain syndrome is a repetitive strain injury consider postures where the thumb is held in abduction and extension to be predisposing factors. Workers who perform rapid repetitive activities involving pinching, grasping, pulling or pushing have been considered at increased risk. These movements are associated with many types of repetitive housework such as chopping vegetables, stirring and scrubbing pots, vacuuming, cleaning surfaces, drying dishes, pegging out washing, mending clothes, gardening, harvesting and weeding. Specific activities that have been postulated as potential risk factors include intensive computer mouse use, trackball use, and typing, as well as some pastimes, including bowling, golf, fly-fishing, piano-playing, sewing, and knitting.

Women are diagnosed more often than men. The syndrome commonly occurs during and, even more so, after pregnancy. Contributory factors may include hormonal changes, fluid retention and—again, more debatably and potentially harmfully—increased housework and lifting.

Pathophysiology

De Quervain syndrome involves noninflammatory thickening of the tendons and the synovial sheaths that the tendons run through. The two tendons concerned are those of the extensor pollicis brevis and abductor pollicis longus muscles. These two muscles run side by side and function to bring the thumb away from the hand (radial abduction). De Quervain tendinopathy affects the tendons of these muscles as they pass from the forearm into the hand via a fibro-osseous tunnel (the first dorsal compartment).
Evaluation of histopathological specimens shows a thickening and myxoid degeneration consistent with a chronic degenerative process, as opposed to inflammation. The pathology is identical in de Quervain seen in new mothers.

Diagnosis
De Quervain syndrome is diagnosed clinically, based on history and physical examination, though diagnostic imaging such as X-ray may be used to rule out fracture, arthritis, or other causes, based on the person's history and presentation. The modified Eichoff maneuver, commonly referred to as the Finkelstein test, is a physical exam maneuver used to diagnose de Quervain syndrome. To perform the test, the examiner grasps and ulnar deviates the hand when the person has their thumb held within their fist. If sharp pain occurs along the distal radius (top of forearm, about an inch below the wrist), de Quervain's syndrome is likely. While a positive Finkelstein test is often considered pathognomonic for de Quervain syndrome, the maneuver can also cause some pain in those with osteoarthritis at the base of the thumb.

Differential diagnosis
Differential diagnoses include:
 Osteoarthritis of the trapezio-metacarpal joint
 Intersection syndrome—pain will be more towards the middle of the back of the forearm and about 2–3 inches below the wrist, usually with associated crepitus.
 Wartenberg's syndrome: The primary symptom is paresthesia (numbness/tingling).

Treatment
Most tendinoses and enthesopathies are self-limiting and the same is likely to be true of de Quervain's although further study is needed.

The mainstay of symptom alleviation (palliative treatment) is a splint that immobilizes the wrist and the thumb to the interphalangeal joint. Activities are more comfortable with such a splint in place. Anti-inflammatory medication or acetaminophen may also alleviate symptoms. 

As with many musculoskeletal conditions, the management of de Quervain's disease is determined more by convention than scientific data. A systematic review and meta-analysis published in 2013 found that corticosteroid injection seems to be an effective form of conservative management of de Quervain's syndrome in approximately 50% of patients, although they have not been well tested against placebo injection. Efficacy data are relatively sparse and it is not clear whether benefits affect the overall natural history of the illness. One of the most common causes of corticosteroid injection failure are subcompartments of the extensor pollicis brevis tendon.

Surgery (in which the sheath of the first dorsal compartment is opened longitudinally) is documented to provide relief in most patients. The most important risk is to the radial sensory nerve. A small incision is made and the dorsal extensor retinaculum is identified. Once it has been identified the release is performed longitudinally along the tendon. This is done to prevent potential subluxation of the 1st compartment tendons. Next the abductor pollicis longus (APL) and extensor pollicis brevis (EPB) are identified and the compartments are released.

Some occupational and physical therapists suggest alternative lifting mechanics based on the theory that the condition is due to repetitive use of the thumbs during lifting. Physical/Occupational therapy can suggest activities to avoid based on the theory that certain activities might exacerbate one's condition, as well as instruct on strengthening exercises based on the theory that this will contribute to better form and use of other muscle groups, which might limit irritation of the tendons.

Some occupational and physical therapists use other treatments, in conjunction with Therapeutic Exercises, based on the rationale that they reduce inflammation and pain and promote healing:  UST, SWD, or other deep heat treatments, as well as TENS, acupuncture, or infrared light therapy, and cold laser treatments.  However, the pathology of the condition is not inflammatory changes to the synovial sheath and inflammation is secondary to the condition from friction. Teaching patients to reduce their secondary inflammation does not treat the underlying condition but may reduce their pain; which is helpful when trying to perform the prescribed exercise interventions.

History
From the original description of the illness in 1895 until the first description of corticosteroid injection by Jarrod Ismond in 1955, it appears that the only treatment offered was surgery.  Since approximately 1972, the prevailing opinion has been that of McKenzie (1972) who suggested that corticosteroid injection was the first line of treatment and surgery should be reserved for unsuccessful injections.

Eponym
It is named after the Swiss surgeon Fritz de Quervain who first identified it in 1895. It should not be confused with de Quervain's thyroiditis, another condition named after the same person.

Society and culture

BlackBerry thumb is a neologism that refers to a form of repetitive strain injury (RSI) caused by the frequent use of the thumbs to press buttons on PDAs, smartphones, or other mobile devices. The name of the condition comes from the BlackBerry, a brand of smartphone that debuted in 1999, although there are numerous other similar eponymous conditions that exist such as "Wiiitis", "Nintendinitis", "Playstation thumb", "texting thumb", "cellphone thumb", "smartphone thumb", "Android thumb", and "iPhone thumb". The medical name for the condition is De Quervain syndrome and is associated with the tendons connected to the thumb through the wrist. Causes for the condition extend beyond smartphones and gaming consoles to include activities like golf, racket sports, and lifting.

Symptoms of BlackBerry thumb include aching and throbbing pain in the thumb and wrist. In severe cases, it can lead to temporary disability of the affected hand, particularly the ability to grip objects.

One hypothesis is that the thumb does not have the dexterity the other four fingers have and is therefore not well-suited to high speed touch typing.

The ailment was mentioned in a July 18, 1964 Peanuts comic strip, where the character Lucy is writing a strong protest letter in pain to the American Medical Association complaining about her "washer woman's elbow," considering it to being a detriment in her chances of becoming a future Miss America and demanding them to finding a cure for it.

See also 
 Mobile phone overuse
 Nomophobia

References

External links 

Overuse injuries
Disorders of synovium and tendon
Syndromes
Wikipedia medicine articles ready to translate

de:Sehnenscheidenentzündung